Abdul Qadir Bajamal (February 18, 1946 – September 7, 2020) was a Yemeni politician who served as Prime Minister from March 31, 2001, to April 7, 2007. He was a member of the General People's Congress party and was appointed as Prime Minister by President Ali Abdullah Saleh. Previously he served as Foreign Minister from 1998 to 2001.

Bajmal died on 7 September 2020 in UAE.

Honours

Foreign honours
 
  Two Sicilian Royal Family: Knight Grand Cross of the Royal Order of Francis I

References

Prime Ministers of Yemen
General People's Congress (Yemen) politicians
People from Sanaa
1946 births
2020 deaths
21st-century Yemeni politicians
20th-century Yemeni politicians
21st-century prime ministers of Yemen
Foreign ministers of Yemen